The 2008 Big Ten men's basketball tournament was played between March 13 and 16, 2008 at Conseco Fieldhouse in Indianapolis, Indiana. It was the eleventh annual Big Ten men's basketball tournament. The championship was won by Wisconsin who defeated Illinois in the championship game. As a result, Wisconsin received the Big Ten's automatic bid to the NCAA tournament. The win marked Wisconsin's second tournament championship in four appearances.

Seeds
All Big Ten schools played in the tournament. Teams were seeded by conference record, with a tiebreaker system used to seed teams with identical conference records. Seeding for the tournament was determined at the close of the regular conference season. The top five teams received a first round bye.

Bracket

Source

All-Tournament Team
 Marcus Landry, Wisconsin – Big Ten tournament Most Outstanding Player
 Demetri McCamey, Illinois
 Shaun Pruitt, Illinois
 Drew Neitzel, Michigan State
 Michael Flowers, Wisconsin

References

External links
Official website
Big Ten Basketball Tournament Logo, Details Unveiled

Big Ten men's basketball tournament
Tournament
Big Ten Conference men's basketball tournament
Big Ten men's basketball tournament
Big Ten Men's Tournament, 2008
College basketball tournaments in Indiana